The Group III tournament was held in the Week commencing February 4, in Tegucigalpa, Honduras, on outdoor hard courts.

Format

The eight teams were split into two groups and played in a round-robin format. The top two teams of each group advanced to the promotion pool, from which the two top teams were promoted to the Americas Zone Group II in 2005. The last two placed teams of each group from the preliminary round were relegated into the relegation pool, from which the two bottom teams were relegated to the Americas Zone Group IV in 2005.

Pool A

Results of Individual Ties

Pool B

Results of Individual Ties

Promotion pool
The top two teams from each of Pools A and B advanced to the Promotion pool. Results and points from games against the opponent from the preliminary round were carried forward.

Results of Individual Ties

Colombia and Netherlands Antilles promoted to Group II for 2005.

Relegation pool
The bottom two teams from Pools A and B were placed in the relegation group.  Results and points from games against the opponent from the preliminary round were carried forward.

Results of Individual Ties

Trinidad & Tobago, US Virgin Islands demoted to Group IV for 2005.

References

2004 Davis Cup Americas Zone
Davis Cup Americas Zone